Harold "Tatto" Fishwick (born 1891, date of death unknown) was an English footballer who played as a centre forward for Tranmere Rovers.

References

1891 births
Association football forwards
English footballers
Footballers from St Helens, Merseyside
Tranmere Rovers F.C. players
Year of death missing